Danya Cebus is an Israeli construction company. It is a subsidiary of Africa Israel Investments. It was founded in 1997. It is active in Russia, Romania, and Israel.

Selected projects

Israel
 Highway 431
 Motza Bridge, Highway 1
 Railway to Karmiel (tunnels, stations)

References

Construction and civil engineering companies of Israel
Israeli companies established in 1997
Tel Aviv District
Construction and civil engineering companies established in 1997